The 1913 Florida Southern Blue and White football team represented Florida Southern College as an independent during the 1913 college football season. The team lost to Florida, 144–0.

Schedule

References

Florida Southern
Florida Southern Moccasins football seasons
Florida Southern Moccasins football